Leon Douglas Ralph (August 20, 1932 – February 6, 2007) was an American politician who served in the California State Assembly from 1967 to 1976. He died on February 6, 2007, in Long Beach, California, at age 74.

References

External links
 Join California Leon D. Ralph

1932 births
2007 deaths
Democratic Party members of the California State Assembly
20th-century American politicians
African-American state legislators in California
United States Air Force personnel of the Korean War
20th-century African-American politicians
21st-century African-American people